Qualification to the curling events at the 2014 Winter Olympics was determined through qualification points earned from participation in the world championships and a qualification event.

Summary

Men

Women

Athlete count

Qualification system
Qualification to the curling tournaments at the Winter Olympics was determined through two methods. Nations may qualify teams by earning qualification points from performances at the 2012 and 2013 World Curling Championships. Nations may also qualify teams through an Olympic qualification event to be held in the fall of 2013. Seven nations will qualify teams via World Championship qualification points, while two nations will qualify through the qualification event. As host nation, Russia will qualify teams automatically, thus making a total of ten teams per gender in the curling tournaments.

Qualification points
The qualification points are allotted based on the nations' final rankings at the World Championships. The points are distributed as follows:

Note: Scotland, England and Wales all compete separately in international curling. By an agreement between the curling federations of those three home nations, only Scotland can score Olympic qualification points on behalf of Great Britain.

Final standings

Qualification event

At the Olympic qualifying event held December 11 to 15, 2013 in Füssen, Germany, the top two teams in the event qualified their nations to participate in the Olympics. The qualification event was open to any nations that earned qualification points at the 2012 or 2013 World Curling Championships (as listed above) or participated at the 2011 World Curling Championships (the South Korea men's team and the Norway women's team).

National qualifying events
Some countries select their teams through trial qualification tournaments.

 2013 Canadian Olympic Curling Trials
 2013 United States Olympic Curling Trials

References

Qualification for the 2014 Winter Olympics
Qualification